Humboldt Graben ( "Humboldt Trench") is a glacier-filled valley,  long, trending north–south between the Humboldt Mountains and the Petermann Ranges in Queen Maud Land, Antarctica. The feature was discovered and mapped by the Third German Antarctic Expedition under Alfred Ritscher, 1938–39, who named it in association with the adjacent Humboldt Mountains.

References

Valleys of Queen Maud Land
Humboldt Mountains (Antarctica)